Howard Gardner Crowell Jr. (born September 2, 1932) is a retired American Army Lieutenant General and former Chief of Staff of the United States European Command. He retired in 1988. He currently resides in Sarasota, Florida where he sits on many boards and amongst them, the treasurer of the Mote Marine Laboratory.

Awards and decorations

References

1932 births
Living people
People from New Bedford, Massachusetts
United States Army generals
United States Army personnel of the Vietnam War
Recipients of the Distinguished Service Medal (US Army)
Recipients of the Silver Star
Recipients of the Legion of Merit
Recipients of the Air Medal
Recipients of the Defense Distinguished Service Medal
Military personnel from Massachusetts